Charilaos Trikoupis Messolonghi B.C. (alternate spelling: Messolonghi) is a Greek professional basketball team that is located in Messolonghi, Greece, with its regular home base being in the city of Messolonghi, Greece. The team's name is often shortened to either Trikoupis B.C. or Messolonghi B.C. It is a part of the multi-sports club Gymnastikos Syllogos Charilaos Trikoupis Messolonghi (Greek: Γυμναστικός Σύλλογος Χαρίλαος Τρικούπης Μεσολογγίου), which is abbreviated as G.S. Charilaos Trikoupis Messolonghi. 

The club is named after Charilaos Trikoupis, who served seven terms as the Prime Minister of Greece, in the 19th century. The club's logo also features a depiction of Trikoupis.

History
The club's parent athletic association, G.S. Charilaos Trikoupis Messolonghi (Γ.Σ. Χαρίλαος Τρικούπης Μεσολογγίου) was founded in 1955. The men's basketball section of the club was founded in 1959. From 1959 to 1971, the club organized local basketball tournaments and competed in friendly games. 

From 1971 to 1982, the club competed in local minor league competitions. Starting with the 1982–83 season, the club began to compete in the regional minor league Association of Basketball Clubs of Northwestern Greece, or E.S.KA.V.D.E. (Ε.Σ.ΚΑ.Β.Δ.Ε). For the 1993–94 season, the club was promoted up to a Greek national competition for the first time, as it joined the Greek 4th Division. The club stayed in the Greek 4th Division for five straight seasons, through the 1997–98 season. After that, the club again played in the local and regional competitions. 

For the 2015–16 season, Trikoupis rejoined the Greek 4th Division. The club then played in the Greek 3rd Division for the first time, in the 2016–17 season. Trikoupis then competed in the Greek 2nd Division for the first time, in the 2018–19 season. The team then managed to win the Greek 2nd Division championship, in the 2019–20 season, with a 19–2 league record, and thus earn a league promotion up to the top-tier level Greek Basket League, for the following season.

Trikoupis then competed in the Greek 1st Division, for the first time, in the 2020–21 season.

Arena
The traditional home arena of Trikoupis is the Missolonghi Indoor Hall, which is located in Missolonghi, Greece. When the club temporarily moved to Agrinio, Greece, for the 2020–21 season, it played its home games at the 1,500 seat Michalis Kousis Agrinio Indoor Hall, which is named in honor of the late Greek marathon runner Michalis Kousis.

Season by season

Titles and honors

Domestic competitions
Greek 2nd Division
 Champions (1): (2020)

Roster

Notable players

 Tasos Antonakis
 Ioannis Agravanis
 Ioannis Chatzinikolas
 Ioannis Demertzis
 Dimitris Gravas
 Spyros Motsenigos
 Sokratis Naoumis
 Stathis Papadionysiou
 Ioannis Sachpatzidis
 Dionysis Skoulidas
 Fotis Vasilopoulos
 Stefan Đorđević
 Danilo Ostojić
 Richard Amardi
 Chad Brown
 A. J. Davis
 Toddrick Gotcher
 Devonte Green
 Kevin Langford
 Eugene Lawrence
 Mark Lyons

Head coaches
 Georgios Deraos: (2015–16)
 Panagiotis Zontos: (2016–18)
 Giannis Dimitriadis: (2018–19)
 Savvas Arapatsanis: (2019)
 Dinos Kalampakos: (2019–2021)

References

External links
Official site 
Greek Basket League Official Team Page 
Eurobasket.com Team Page

Charilaos Trikoupis B.C.
Basketball teams established in 1959
Basketball teams in Greece